Fumitremorgins are tremorogenic metabolites of Aspergillus and Penicillium, that belong to a class of naturally occurring 2,5-diketopiperazines.

References

Indole alkaloids
Fumitremorgin
Diketopiperazines